Calgary-North (previously styled Calgary North) is a single member electoral district in Calgary, Alberta. The electoral district existed from 1959 to 1971, and was re-established for the 2019 Alberta general election.

Boundary history

1959 Redistribution
The Alberta government decided to return to using the first past the post system of voting from Single Transferable Vote for the 1959 general election. The province redistributed the Calgary and Edmonton super riding's and standardized the voting system across the province.

Calgary North was one of the six electoral districts created that year in Calgary. The others were Calgary Bowness, Calgary Centre, Calgary West, Calgary Glenmore, Calgary North East, and Calgary South East.

The riding was abolished in 1971, split up between Calgary-McKnight, Calgary-North Hill and Calgary-Mountain View.

2017 redistribution
The riding was re-created (with the current hyphenated name) from Calgary-Mackay-Nose Hill and Calgary-Northern Hills. It will be contested in the next Alberta general election.

Representation history

The first election held in 1959 was contested by two incumbents from the Calgary electoral district facing each other, Rose Wilkinson and Grant MacEwan, plus former MLA Aylmer Liesemer who had been defeated in the 1955 Alberta general election. Wilkinson would win and serve her final term representing the district.

The second election held in 1963 would see Social Credit keep the seat under MLA Robert Simpson. He would win a second term in 1967 and hold the district until it was abolished in 1971.

Election results

1950s and 60s

2010s
{| class="wikitable"
! colspan="4" align=center|2015 Alberta general election redistributed results

References

External links
Website of the Legislative Assembly of Alberta

Politics of Calgary
Alberta provincial electoral districts